This is a list of the Masters (later Headmasters) and Ushers (later Second Masters) of Gresham's School, Holt.

Masters, 1562–1900
1571: Master Robinson
1574–1582: Master Harrison
1585–1602: Christopher Williams
1602–1605: Rev. Richard Snoden MA
1605–1606: Rev. Francis Catlyn MA
1606–1639: Thomas Tallis MA
1639–1640: Rev. Nathaniel Gill
1640: Thomas Tallis (again)
1640–1644: Sir Thomas Witherley
1644–1646: John Fenn
1646–1659: Rev. Francis Wright MA, fellow of Merton College, Oxford
1659–1660: Rev. William Hickes MA, previously Master of Oundle
1660–1665: Rev. Henry Mazy MA
1665–1667: Rev. John Goodman (acting Master)
1667–1692: Rev. Thomas Bainbridge MA
1692–1697: Rev. William Reynolds MA
1697–1702: Edward Reynolds
1702–1715: Rev. William Reynolds MA
1715–1729: Rev. David Duncombe MA (d. 1729)
1730–1760: John Holmes - writer of textbooks on grammar, rhetoric and astronomy
1760: John Knox
1760–1787: James Smith
1787–1806: Thomas Atkins
1806–1807: Rev. Mr Babington (acting Master)
1807–1809: Thomas Atkins (again)
1809–1857: Rev. Benjamin Pulleyne, or Pullan MA, fellow of Clare College, Cambridge
1858–1867: Rev. Charles Allen Elton MA BD, fellow of Sidney Sussex College, Cambridge
1867–1900: Rev. Reginald Jolliffe Roberts MA

Headmasters, 1900 to date
1900–1919: George William Saul Howson MA, formerly of Uppingham, reforming headmaster
1919–1935: J. R. Eccles MA
1935–1944: Philip Staniforth Newell MA
1944–1955: Martin John Olivier MA - previously of Rossall, later head of Guthlaxton College, Wigston Magna 
1955–1982: Logie Bruce Lockhart, international rugby footballer
1982–1985: Dr Timothy Phillips Woods MA DPhil
1985–1991: Hugh Wright MA, later Chief Master of King Edward's School, Birmingham (1991–1998) and Chairman of the HMC
1991–2002: John Hardy Arkell MA, formerly head of Wrekin College
2002–2008: Anthony Roy Clark MA, - formerly head of St. Andrew's College, Grahamstown, South Africa
2008–2013 : Philip John - formerly head of King William's College, Isle of Man
2013–2014 : Nigel Flower (acting headmaster)
2014– : Douglas Robb MA MEd

Ushers

1602–1606: Nicholas Stephenson
? to 1621: John Watson
1627–1632: Thomas Cooper
1632–1638: Nicholas Davie
1638: Thomas Cooper (again)
1638–1639: Henry Luce
1640: Henry Luce (again)
1640–1643: Timothy Cutler
1643–1644: Thomas Cooper (again) - hanged in 1650 as a Royalist rebel
1658–1660: Henry Mazy
1661–1665: John Goodman
1689–1692: Thomas Kellway
1692: William Chambers
1692–1695: Thomas Garrett
1695: William Rowland
1696–1697: Thomas Turner
1697–1704: Thomas Plumstead
1705–1708: John Reynolds
1708: John Fox
1708–1713: William Selth
1713–1714: John Spurling
1714–1715: William Chaplyn
c. 1718: John Brooke
c. 1725: John Holmes
1729: Edward Read
1770s: Christopher Stangroom
1796–1801: David Kinnebrook
1810–1811: Reverend Robert Davies
1811–1813: Peter Barney
1813–1821: Daniel Carr
1821: James Sturley
1821–1828: Thomas Beckwith
1828–1843: William Robert Taylor
1843–1851: John Slann (first Second Master)

Thomas Beckwith used the title "undermaster" in 1821.

Second masters

1843–1851: John Slann (last Usher)
1851: William Allen Rudkin
1851–1857: John Hubbert Kent
1858–1860: J. Rodney Phillips
1860: Berney Wodehouse Raven
1860–1862: Charles Frederick Furbank
1862–1863: Frederick Roy Dowson
1863–1864: George W. Anstiss
1864–1865: Henry David Jones
1865–1866: William Henry Hooper
1866–1867: Matthew Walter Tunnicliffe
1867: William Remington Backhouse
1867: John Robinson Wells
1867–1869: Robert Stokes
1869–1871: Robert Campbell Conolly
1871–1872: John Lowndes>
1872–1880: Stephen Bousfield
1881–1900: John Henry Howell
1900–1907: John Goodrich Wemyss Woods
1907–1919: James Ronald Eccles, later headmaster
1919–1928: John Chambré Miller
1928–1942: Joseph Foster
1942–1963: A. Bruce Douglas
1963–1970: Bernard Sankey
1970–1977: Paul V. A. Colombé
1977–1985: John Coleridge
1985–2001: Richard N. K. Copas

Deputy heads (Pastoral)
2001–2006: S. Smart
2006–2016: N. C. Flower
2016–present: W.A.M. Chuter

Deputy Heads (Academic)
2001–2010: N. White
2010–2013: D. Miles
2013–2016 : S. Kinder
2016–present: T.P. Hipperson

Chaplains
1900–1901: R. L. Langford 
1901–1908: E. E. M. Benson
1908–1930: Francis George Elwes Field, MA (Cantab.), previously headmaster of Truro Grammar School
1930–1932: J. W. Reynolds
1932–1946: Edward Francis Habershon
1946–1950: Charles L. S. Linnell
1950–1959: Wilfred Andrews
1959–1974: Douglas C. Argyle
1974–1975: Percival Hallewell Rogers (previously headmaster of Portora Royal School, Enniskillen, 1954–1973)
1975–1983 T. Ray Bowen
1983–1991: A. Wadge
1991–1992: R. Buckner
1992–2000: R. N. Myerscough
2000–2020 Bryan R. Roberts

Headmasters of the Junior School
1954–1969: John B. Williams
1969–1979: Michael Hughes
1979–1984: Neville Jones

The Junior School was reorganized into the Preparatory School and the Pre-Preparatory School in 1984.

Headmasters of the Preparatory School
1984–2003: Tony Cuff
2003–2018: James Quick
2018-date: Catherine Braithwaite

Heads of the Pre-Preparatory School
1984–1991: Penelope Moore
1991–1997: Lesley Gillick
1997–2002: Daphne Dawson-Smith
2002–2017: Janette Davidson
2017–present: Sarah Hollingsworth

Housemasters and staff
Boys' houses
  

Girls' houses

Notable masters
John Holmes (master, 1730–1760), writer of textbooks on grammar, rhetoric and astronomy
George Howson (headmaster, 1900–1919)
Geoffrey Shaw (music master, 1902–1910), organist and composer
C. V. Durell (assistant master, 1904–05), writer of mathematics textbooks
Warin Foster Bushell (assistant master, 1907–1912), later headmaster of Michaelhouse and Birkenhead School and president of the Mathematical Association
Dalziel Llewellyn Hammick (assistant master, Chemistry, 1910–1918) - research chemist
Walter Greatorex (director of music, 1911–1949), composer
Arnold Powell (assistant master, early 1900s), later head of Bedford Modern School and Epsom College
Frank McEachran (assistant master from 1924), author
Denys Thompson (assistant master, English, 1930s), editor of the quarterly Scrutiny with F. R. Leavis and of the journal The Use of English
Richard D'Aeth (assistant master, 1938–1940)
Charles W. Lloyd (assistant master, 1946–1951), later master of Dulwich College
Logie Bruce Lockhart (headmaster, 1955–1982), Scotland rugby footballer
Richard Smyth (born 1951), later head of King's School, Bruton
Hugh Wright (headmaster 1985-1991), later chief master of King Edward's School, Birmingham (1991–1998) and Chairman of the HMC
Patrick Thompson (assistant master, physics, 1965–1983), Conservative Member of Parliament
Graeme Fife (classics master, 1970–1979), writer, playwright and broadcaster

See also
Gresham's School
List of Old Greshamians
:Category:People educated at Gresham's School

References

Gresham's School
Lists of people by employer
Lists of educators
Lists of people by English school affiliation
Norfolk-related lists